Rockland Country Day School was a private coed college-preparatory school that served students in Pre-K through 12th grade. It was located in Congers, New York and was founded in 1959 as an alternative to public education in Rockland County. The school's stated mission was to "[bring] forth the best in every student by knowing and educating each of them as an individual."  In 2019 the school was to have celebrated its 60th anniversary, but on August 20, 2019, the school announced it would be closing.

History
The Rockland Country Day School was established in 1959 by a group of local community leaders including Pem McCurdy and Kendall Pennypacker, led by Prof. Charles Frankel of Columbia University.  Originally located in South Nyack, New York, the school moved to Congers, New York when it outgrew its original location. The Congers location was sold to the Town of Clarkstown and the school leased the property back for a planned five year term, however in August 2019, the school announced it would close due to declining enrollment and fiscal challenges.

Curriculum
RCDS focused on an individualized approach to education for each of its students. The Pre-K through Grade 12 curriculum offered a variety of academics, arts and inquiry, with multi-age classes and opportunities for mentorship and leadership across the grades. They had relatively small classes, with a roughly 7-to-1 student to teacher ratio.

Notable alumni
 Ken Be, lutist
Han-na Chang, cellist
Tyne Daly, actress
Adam Gussow, blues harmonica player
Isabelle McCalla, actress
Lea Michele, singer/actress
Ezra Miller, actor
Keith Raniere, founder of self-improvement organization NXIVM and a convicted felon
Johanna Rose, singer and founding member of Anonymous 4
Sebastian Stan, actor
Grace VanderWaal, singer/actress

References

Educational institutions established in 1959
Defunct schools in New York (state)
1959 establishments in New York (state)